Kamdev Singh (also spelt as Kamdeo Singh) was a gangster, smuggler and mafia strongman from Begusarai district of Bihar, India. He was an anti-communist and for the locals of his hometown, he has been called a "Robin Hood" and "God". Kamdev Singh was hired by various politicians for booth capturing. His son is Rajkumar Singh.

References 

Criminals from Bihar
Indian anti-communists